Junior Assoumou Akue (born 22 July 1995) is a footballer who plays for US Granville as a centre back. Born in France, he represents Gabon at international level.

Career
Born in Le Mans, France, he has played club football for Rennes B, Chamois Niortais B, SO Romorantin and Pau.

He made his international debut for Gabon in 2017.

References

1995 births
Living people
Footballers from Le Mans
People with acquired Gabonese citizenship
Gabonese footballers
Gabon international footballers
French footballers
French sportspeople of Gabonese descent
Stade Rennais F.C. players
Chamois Niortais F.C. players
SO Romorantin players
Pau FC players
US Granville players
AS Vitré players
Bourges Foot 18 players
Aubagne FC players
Championnat National players
Championnat National 2 players
Championnat National 3 players
Association football defenders
2021 Africa Cup of Nations players
Black French sportspeople